War Commentary was a British World War II era anti-militarist anti-war anarchist newspaper published fortnightly in London by Freedom Press from 1939 to 1945. The paper was launched as a successor to Revolt! and Spain and the World and was opposed to World War II along anti-capitalist and anti-state lines.

Regular contributors to the paper included Vernon Richards, Marie Louise Berneri, John Hewetson, Philip Sansom, and Ethel Mannin, with John Olday contributing cartoons. Occasional contributors included Tom Brown, Reginald Reynolds, George Woodcock, and Colin Ward.

1945 Freedom Defence Trial 
The British state had been reluctant to take action against Freedom Press and War Commentary, though the government were monitoring the paper while Special Branch and MI5 spied on those involved in the paper.

However, as the war coming to a close, police action against the paper increased and in 1945 the four editors of the paper – Berneri, Hewetson, Richards and Sansom – were arrested and charged with conspiring to cause disaffection among members of the armed forces under Defence Regulation 39a. The four day trial at the Old Bailey saw significant press coverage and public controversy. The Freedom Defence Committee was launched, which included notable figures such as George Orwell, Simon Watson Taylor, Herbert Read, Harold Laski, Kingsley Martin, Benjamin Britten, Augustus John, and Bertrand Russell. The committee had been formed in part because at the time the National Council for Civil Liberties had been considered a communist front. Richards, Sansom and Hewetson were sentenced to nine months imprisonment, while the charges against Berneri – who was married to Richards – were dropped as legally a wife could not be prosecuted for conspiring with her husband – about which she was reportedly furious.

With Richards, Hewetson and Sansom in prison, Berneri was joined by George Woodcock who together took on editorship of the paper. The court case greatly raised the profile of War Commentary and Freedom Press. While the Freedom Defence Committee continued to organise until disbanding in 1949.

In August 1945 the paper was relaunched as Freedom.

External links 

 Freedom Press Newspaper Archive

References 

Anarchist newspapers
Anti-militarism in Europe
Newspapers established in 1939
Political newspapers published in the United Kingdom
Anarchist periodicals published in the United Kingdom
United Kingdom in World War II
Opposition to World War II